Epsilon Draconis, Latinized from ε Draconis, is a fourth-magnitude star in the constellation Draco. This star along with Delta Draconis (Altais), Pi Draconis and Rho Draconis forms an asterism known as Al Tāis, meaning "the Goat".

Most authors do not use a traditional name for this star, using instead the Bayer designation; 
but Bečvář (1951) listed it as Tyl .

Visibility 
With a declination in excess of 70 degrees north, Epsilon Draconis is principally visible in the northern hemisphere, with southern locations north of 20° South able to see it just above the horizon.  The star is circumpolar throughout all of Europe, China, most of India and as far south as the tip of the Baja peninsula in North America as well as other locations around the globe having a latitude greater than ± 20° North.  Since Epsilon Draconis has an apparent magnitude of almost 4.0, the star is easily observable to the naked eye as long as one's stargazing is not hampered by the light pollution common to most cities.

The best time for observation is in the evening sky during the summer months, when the "Dragon constellation" passes the meridian at midnight, but given its circumpolar nature in the northern hemisphere, it is visible to most of the world's inhabitants throughout the year.

Properties 
Epsilon Draconis is a yellow giant star with a spectral type of G8III. It has a radius that has been estimated at 11 solar radii and a mass of 2.7 solar masses.  Compared to most G class stars, Epsilon Draconis is a relatively young star with an estimated age of around 500 million years old. Like the majority of giant stars, Epsilon Draconis rotates slowly on its axis with a rotational velocity of 1.2 km/s, a speed which takes the star approximately 420 days to make one complete revolution.

In 2007, Floor van Leeuwen and his team calibrated the star's apparent magnitude at 3.9974 with an updated parallax of 22.04 ± 0.37 milliarcseconds, yielding a distance of 45.4 parsecs or approximately 148 light years from Earth.  Given a surface temperature of 5,068 Kelvin, theoretical calculations would yield a total luminosity for the star of about 60 times the solar luminosity.

Star system 
Epsilon Draconis is resolvable as a double star in telescopes of 10 centimeters aperture or larger. The companion has an apparent brightness of 7.3 at an angular distance of 3.2 arcseconds. It is a giant of spectral class F5, orbiting the yellow giant at about 130 astronomical units.

See also 
 Lists of stars in the constellation Draco
 Class G Stars
 Variable star
 Double star

References

External links 
Astrophotographs:Epsilon Draconis
SkyView Image: Epsilon Draconis
 

G-type giants
Double stars

Draco (constellation)
Draconis, Epsilon
BD+69 1070
Draconis, 63
188119
097433
7582
Tyl